Ajahn Jayasāro (born Shaun Michael Chiverton in 1958) is a British and Thai Buddhist monk in the Forest Tradition of Ajahn Chah.

Biography
Jayasāro was born on the Isle of Wight in England. At the age of sixteen, having been in contact with Buddhism through reading, he left for India, where he spent "a couple of years" traveling and learning before hitchhiking back to England. At the time he was still looking for a way of life in line with his personal principles. In Asia he heard about an Englishman who had been a monk in the Thai Forest Tradition and was leading meditation retreats. Upon hearing his stories of life as a forest monk, he realised it was the way of life he was looking for.

After joining Ajahn Sumedho's community as an anagārika in 1978 he travelled to Thailand to ordain at Wat Nong Pah Pong in 1979. He received full ordination by Ajahn Chah in 1980 and was abbot of Wat Pah Nanachat from 1997 to 2002. He currently lives alone in a one-monk monastery in Thailand.

In 2018, Jayasāro authored a biography of Ajahn Chah entitled Stillness Flowing.

In 2019, Jayasāro was honoured with a royal title from Thailand's King Vajiralongkorn (Rama X). On 9 March 2020, Jayasāro was granted Thai citizenship by royal decree.

Thai honorific ranks
 28 July 2019 - Phra Raj Bajramanit Bisithadharmagunasundorn Mahakanisorn Bovornsangaram Gamavasi (พระราชพัชรมานิต พิสิฐธรรมคุณสุนทร มหาคณิสสร บวรสังฆาราม คามวาสี)
 17 July 2020 - Phra Thep Bajranyanamuni Vipassanavidhikosol Vimolbhavanavarakit Mahakanisorn Bovornsangaram Gamavasi (พระเทพพัชรญาณมุนี วิปัสสนาวิธีโกศล วิมลภาวนาวรกิจ มหาคณิสสร บวรสังฆาราม คามวาสี)
 7 July 2021 - Phra Dharma Bajranyanamuni Phawanavidhisuvithan Srilajahnsuvimol Kosonkitchanukit Mahakanisorn Bovornsangaram Gamavasi (พระธรรมพัชรญาณมุนี ภาวนาวิธีสุวิธาน สีลาจารสุวิมล โกศลกิจจานุกิจ มหาคณิสสร บวรสังฆาราม คามวาสี)

Notable works

Other Publications
Letting Go Within Action (2018)
Seen in their true light (2012)
Daughters and Sons (2012)
On Love (2012)
The Real Practice (2008)
Twain Shall Meet

References

Sources

External links
ธรรมะ โดย พระอาจารย์ชยสาโร/ Dhamma by Ajahn Jayasaro (Youtube channel maintained by authorized lay supporters)
Blue Eyes in Saffron Robes (a 1979 documentary featuring Ajahn Jayasāro)
Teachings by Ajahn Jayasāro

1958 births
Living people
Clergy from the Isle of Wight
English Buddhist monks
British emigrants to Thailand
Thai Forest Tradition monks
Ajahn Jayasaro